is a 1977 tokusatsu series created by Shotaro Ishinomori and produced by Toei. It revolves around a giant battle robot commanded by a young boy who fights the giant robots of an evil organization bent on world conquest.  It is similar to Giant Robo in premise and how it ends.

Several episodes were edited into a TV movie shown in the United States under different titles, including The Defenders and the Great Brain and Brain 17 (1982).

The opening theme was performed by Ichirou Mizuki,  Koorogi '73 and The Chirps.

Popy manufactured several toys based on the series - notably a transforming Chogokin version of the robot One-Seven (later released in America for the Godaikin line), vehicles based on One-Seven's Flying Fortress mode, the Sub Machine Flying Car, the Shigcon Tank and the Shigcon Jet, and a three-inch version of One-Seven, which was later released as "17" in Mattel's Shogun Warriors line.

Story
Brain is the world's greatest computer, and also the most intelligent being on planet Earth. One day, Brain decides to abandon its terrestrial moorings, and it's up to The Red Mufflers to track it down. Unfortunately, Brain has developed an amazing army of deadly giant robots, including one with a huge "17" emblazoned on its chest-plate, with which it plans to subjugate its creators. A young boy whose family was killed by Brain's followers manages to activate Daitetsujin 17, which thereafter comes to his rescue whenever he is in danger from Brain's minions.

References

External links
Daitetsujin 17 Fan Site (Japanese)
Brain 17 at the Internet Movie Database
Daitetsujin 17 Toy Review 

1977 Japanese television series debuts
1977 Japanese television series endings
Mainichi Broadcasting System original programming
Shotaro Ishinomori
Tokusatsu television series
Toei tokusatsu
Super robot anime and manga